Daniel Etim Effiong, also Daniel Etim-Effiong is a Nigerian Nollywood actor and film director.

Life and education
He was born in Jaji, Kaduna State, Nigeria and had lived in Benin City, Edo State; Lagos State and Abuja. His dad was in the Nigerian Army. His father, former Lt. Col. Moses Effiong was granted official presidential pardon by the Nigerian president Muhammadu Buhari alongside five others sentenced to life imprisonment in 1986 after the allegedly failed Vatsa Coup during the Ibrahim Babangida regime on charges of treason concealment against the regime and released in 1993 but without official proclamation and restoration of ranks and entitlements.

In his formative years, he attended St. Mary's Private School, Lagos Island, Lagos and afterwards advanced for his secondary education at Government College, Ikorodu, Lagos. He thereafter proceeded to the Federal University of Technology, Minna, Niger State, where he studied and obtained a first degree in chemical engineering. After a brief working period in the oil and gas industry as an engineer, he decided to switch careers and proceeded to study filmmaking, writing and directing at AFDA Film School in South Africa and later undertook a course at the University of Johannesburg in filmmaking.

Career
After quitting his oil and gas job, he became a content producer for NdaniTV.

In 2017, he directed a five-minute-long short film titled, "Prey", which was produced by his newly wedded wife, Toyosi, featuring Tope Tedela and Odenike Odetola.

He was featured in 2019 by Bland2Glam in her #thePowerof7 campaign to celebrate her seven years in the fashion industry.

He featured alongside Kenyan actresses Sarah Hassan and Catherine Kamau Karanja in the 2019 comedy movie, Plan B where he played Dele Coker, a Nigerian CEO of a Nairobi-based company, . The movie got him a nomination in the Best Actor in a Comedy (Movie/TV Series) category at the 7th AMVCA awards 2020.

He starred in a number of 2020 movies. He played a lead role in the movie, "Fish Bone", produced by Editi Effiong also starring Shaffy Bello and Moshood Fattah. He was featured alongside Ike Onyema and Atteh 'SirDee' Daniel in the short film, "Storm", produced by Diane Russet and directed by Michael 'AMA Psalmist' Akinrogunde. Still in 2020, he directed a documentary titled, "Skin", produced by Beverly Naya. It was slated to be shown on NETFLIX.

Filmography

TV Shows

Films

Personal life
Effiong has been married to Toyosi Phillips since November 4, 2017. They first met in August 2016 while processing a project. In December 2018, they were said to be expecting a baby. The couple welcomed their first child, a baby girl, on January 7, 2019.

References

External links
 Daniel Etim Effiong on IMDb
 

Nigerian film directors
Nigerian male film actors
Living people
People from Kaduna State
Year of birth missing (living people)
Federal University of Technology, Minna alumni
University of Johannesburg alumni
Nigerian screenwriters
Nigerian entertainment industry businesspeople
Nigerian chemical engineers